Piña is a corregimiento in Chagres District, Colón Province, Panama with a population of 836 as of 2010. Its population as of 1990 was 687; its population as of 2000 was 700.

References

Corregimientos of Colón Province